IJsselmonde may refer to:

 IJsselmonde (island), an island near Rotterdam, Netherlands
 IJsselmonde (village), a former village on the island of IJsselmonde
 IJsselmonde (Rotterdam), one of the boroughs of Rotterdam